The Cooper T49 (Type 49), also known as the Cooper Monaco T49, or the Cooper T49 Monaco, is a lightweight sports racing car, designed, developed and built by the British manufacturer Cooper, in 1959. It was manufactured as the successor to the Cooper T39 (more commonly known as the 'Bobtail'). It competed in motor racing between 1959 and 1966, and was extremely successful, as well as being very competitive. It won 89 races (plus an additional 16 class wins), scored 136 podium finishes, and clinched 11 pole positions.

References

Cooper racing cars
Sports racing cars
1950s cars
Cars of England